The Andrus Ansip's second cabinet was the Cabinet of Estonia between 5 April 2007 and 6 April 2011. It was a coalition cabinet of the  free market liberal Estonian Reform Party, conservative Union of Pro Patria and Res Publica and Social Democratic Party.

As in the dire economic situation the government turned out incapable to solve the problem of required budget cuts the Social Democratic Party left from the coalition on 21 May 2009 and its three ministers were relieved from their posts. Coalition talks with the People's Union of Estonia were derailed on 1 June 2009 by councils of the People's Union and of the Union of Pro Patria and Res Publica. Therefore, from 4 June 2009 the cabinet continued as a minority cabinet with 50 seats out of 101 in the Riigikogu.

It was succeeded by Ansip's next cabinet on 6 April 2011 after the 2011 election.

Ministers

See also
Politics of Estonia

External links
Official Website of Estonian Government – Government 5 April 2007 – 6 April 2011

References

Cabinets of Estonia
2007 establishments in Estonia
2011 disestablishments in Estonia
Cabinets established in 2007
Cabinets disestablished in 2011